Brian P. Jones is an American educator, scholar, activist, and actor. He is the inaugural director of the Center for Educators and Schools of The New York Public Library, and formerly the associate director of Education at the Schomburg Center for Research in Black Culture, where he was also a scholar in residence. Jones earned a PhD in Urban Education at the CUNY Graduate Center and has contributed to several books on issues of racism, inequality, and Black education history, most recently to Black Lives Matter At School: An Uprising for Educational Justice. He is the author of The Tuskegee Student Uprising: A History (NYU Press Black Power Series).

Jones is a long time member of the board of directors of Voices of a Peoples History of the United States, founded by Anthony Arnove and Howard Zinn to organize and promote public performances of primary texts from radical American history. In addition to his role as a director, Jones also often serves as an educator and as a performer. Jones' collaboration with Arnove and Zinn dates back to his nationwide of tour of Zinn's one-man play Marx in Soho, in which Jones played the title role. He has also lent his voice to other projects, such as The Flores Exhibits (a series of short videos amplifying the voices of children held in detention facilities at the U.S. / Mexico Border) and he has narrated more than twenty audiobooks, including Hegemony or Survival, Detroit, I Do Mind Dying, and Marx in Soho.

A teacher of elementary grades in the New York City Public Schools for 9 years, Jones has been a prominent critic of school privatization. He co-narrated the independent film "The Inconvenient Truth Behind Waiting for Superman", which challenged the ideas of the 2010 documentary Waiting for "Superman".

In 2014, Jones ran for Lieutenant Governor of New York alongside Howie Hawkins on the Green Party of New York ticket. They received 184,419 votes (4.86%), which was more than enough for the party to retain statewide recognition. Jones was a member of the International Socialist Organization, which dissolved in early 2019.

Jones has been published in a wide variety of media including The New York Times, The Guardian, Socialist Worker, Jacobin, and Chalkbeat. He is married to theatre, television, and film actor Susan Pourfar.

References

Year of birth missing (living people)
Living people
Graduate Center, CUNY alumni
Writers from New York (state)
African-American schoolteachers
African-American male actors
American male actors
Members of the International Socialist Organization
New York (state) Greens
Schoolteachers from New York (state)
Place of birth missing (living people)